This is a list of wettest tropical cyclones by country, using all known available sources. Data is most complete for Australia, Cuba, Dominican Republic, Japan, Hong Kong, Mexico, Taiwan, Micronesia's Yap and Chuuk, and the United States, with fragmentary data available for other countries. The French region of Réunion holds several world records for tropical cyclone and worldwide rainfall, due to the rough topography and its location in the Indian Ocean.

Below are the records for each country above.

Antigua and Barbuda

Australia

Christmas Island

Christmas Island is an Australian territory located in the Indian Ocean located at the summit of a submarine mountain, which rises steeply to a central plateau that is dominated by stands of rainforest. After rainfall and wind observations started on the island during 1972, only 13 tropical cyclones passed within  of the territory between 1972 and 2005.

Cocos Islands

Rainfall observations started on the islands during 1907, while temperature, wind and other records started in 1952.

Bahamas

Bangladesh

Bangladesh has been the scene of the greatest tropical cyclone casualties in recent times. The country is quite flat and generally lies near sea level.

Belize
The highest reported rainfall in what was formerly British Honduras occurred during Hurricane Keith in 2000 when  of rain fell in a 24‑hour period at Phillip Goodson International Airport in Belize City. Equally heavy rains could have fallen during Hurricane Hattie of 1961 and Hurricane Fifi of 1974.

Cambodia

Canada

Tropical cyclones are usually in transition to extratropical cyclones by the time they reach Atlantic Canada, though occasionally they retain their tropical status. No tropical cyclone has ever hit Canada's Pacific coast.

China

China is a mountainous country, which leads to rapid dissipation of cyclones that move inland as well as significant amounts of rain from those dissipating cyclones. Typhoon Nina (1975) caused the collapse of two huge reservoirs and ten smaller dams when  fell in Henan during a 24‑hour period, which is the record for Mainland China. Typhoon Sam of the 1999 Pacific typhoon season became the wettest known tropical cyclone to impact Hong Kong since records began in 1884, breaking a 73‑year‑old record. Precipitation associated with tropical cyclones and their remains can bring snow to Tibet. This led to a loss of 340,000 kg of food, 230,000 kg of forage grass, and 263 livestock in the snowstorm.

Mainland

Hong Kong

Costa Rica

Cuba
Hurricane Flora of October 1963 drifted across Cuba for four days, leading to extreme rainfall across the mountainous island country. During the heaviest 24‑hour period of rainfall,  of rain fell at Santiago de Cuba.

Dominica

The islands of the eastern Caribbean are constantly threatened by tropical storms and hurricanes, mainly between August and October. As Hurricane Jeanne moved through the region,  of rain fell during the 24‑hour period ending on the morning of September 15, 2004.

Dominican Republic

Most of the tropical cyclone rainfall totals on the list below are 24‑hour maxima, which likely underrepresent the storm total.

El Salvador

Fiji

Orography from the volcanic islands of Fiji has led to significant rainfall during tropical cyclone passages, which occur roughly once a year.

France

French Polynesia

Guadeloupe
Hurricane Marilyn moved directly across the island in mid-September 1995, bringing the highest known rainfall totals to the island from a tropical cyclone.

Martinique
Martinique is a mountainous island at the fringe of the eastern Caribbean Sea.

New Caledonia

Réunion Island

The mountainous island of Réunion has experienced several of the highest rainfall totals on record from tropical cyclones and holds the rainfall world records for 12, 24, 48, 72 hours, four, five, six, seven, eight, nine and ten days as a result. The 12 and 24 hourly rainfall records were set at Foc-Foc by Cyclone Denise in 1966, while an Unnamed Tropical Cyclone between April 8–10, 1958 set the record for 48 hours at Aurere. Tropical Cyclone Gamede between February 24–28, 2007 came close to beating the records for 12, 24 and 48 hours before setting the records for three, four, five, six, seven, eight and nine days that were held by Tropical Cyclone Hyacinthe 1980.

Saint Martin

Wallis and Futuna

Guatemala
Tropical Storm Agatha in May 2010 became the second-wettest tropical cyclone in the nation's history when it slowly developed while remaining nearly stationary to the southwest of Guatemala, before turning northeast and dissipating across inland Central America.

Haiti
Haiti that makes up three-eighths of Hispaniola, is a mountainous country that has experienced some of the most powerful hurricanes on record, including Hurricane David. Its three mountain ranges have peaks as high as 8793 feet/2680 meters above sea level.

Honduras

Swan Island

India

India can be struck by cyclones that form in the Bay of Bengal or the Arabian Sea.

Indonesia

The precursor tropical disturbance of Tropical Cyclone Inigo in April 2003 dropped heavy rainfall in eastern Indonesia. The rainfall caused flash flooding and mudslides, primarily in Flores but also on West Timor and Sumba. In some locations, the depth of the floodwaters reached . The Oessao River in West Timor exceeded its banks, which flooded seven villages. In Kupang in West Timor, the system destroyed hundreds of homes and large fields of corn, bean, and rice crop. Heavy damage was reported near Ende, where flooding and mudslides destroyed 20 houses and destroyed the roads connecting to East Flores. The city airport was flooded with one meter (3 ft) of water, preventing aerial transportation and which left the city temporarily isolated. In East Flores Regency in eastern Flores Island, the system left 75 destroyed houses, along with 77 severely damaged and a further 56 receiving light damage.

Iran

Jamaica

This mountainous island country of Jamaica can get lashed with rainfall by slow-moving tropical cyclones in the western Caribbean Sea.

Japan

The mountainous island archipelago is constantly struck by typhoons recurving out of the tropics, which are normally in extratropical transition as they pass through Japan. Typhoon Namtheun of the 2004 Pacific typhoon season holds the national 24-hour precipitation record with  observed in Kisawa village, surpassing the previous record of  set during Typhoon Fran in 1976.

Okinawa

Ryukyu Islands
Typhoon Rusa caused  of rain to fall at Naze on August 29–30, 2002. Typhoon Aere dropped  of rain in the 65‑hour period ending at 1400 UTC on August 25, 2004, at Ishigakihima. Typhoon Agnes in August 1957 dropped  of rainfall on Marcus Island. In 1972, Typhoon Rita dumped  on Okinoerabu Shima.

Johnston Atoll
Tropical cyclones occasionally threaten this central Pacific island. Hurricane Celeste of 1972 brought  to the isle around August 19.

Korea
The Korean Peninsula experiences typhoons regularly. Tropical cyclones which impact southern China also lead to, on average, five heavy rainfall events per year across the Korean peninsula.

North Korea

South Korea

Madagascar

The north end of the island, known as the Tsaratanana Massif region, contains terrain with elevations up to 9417 feet/2880 meters.

Malaysia

Mauritius

Marshall Islands

Mexico

Hurricane Wilma of 2005 drifted over the northeast portion of the Yucatán peninsula for a couple of days, dropping significant rains. Below is a list of the highest known storm total rainfall amounts from individual tropical cyclones across Mexico. Most of the rainfall information was provided by the Mexico's National Weather Service, Servicio Meteorológico Nacional, which is a part of the National Water Commission, Comisión Nacional del Agua.

Federated States of Micronesia

Chuuk
Typhoon Chataan led to excessive rainfall on this island from June 23 – July 3, 2002, when a total of  fell. During the time frame when Chataan was declared a tropical cyclone from July 1–3,  fell, with  falling on the 2nd alone at the international airport.

Kosrae

Pohnpei State
The state is mountainous island lies in the tropical northwest Pacific Ocean.

Yap State
The wettest known tropical cyclone for the state was Ruby in 1982, which drifted in the island's vicinity for several days during its initial development phase.

Mozambique

Myanmar

Nepal
Some of the highest elevations on the planet lie in Nepal. Eight out of fourteen highest peaks in the world lie in the Nepalese Himalaya including the highest peak of the World, Mt. Everest (8848 m). During a tropical depression that affected the Indian Subcontinent in 2004,  of rain fell at Kathmandu airport in the 24‑hour period ending at 1200 UTC on October 7.

Netherlands Antilles

Saba

St. Eustatius

Saint Martin/Sint Maarten
This hilly island is partially owned by France and partially claimed by the Netherlands.

New Zealand

Most tropical cyclones which pass near New Zealand are in extratropical transition (ET) or have become extratropical, which can enhance their heavy rainfall threat.

Nicaragua

Niue

Oman

Pakistan

Tropical cyclones for the Arabian Sea usually affect Pakistan. Tropical cyclones from the Bay of Bengal can affect Pakistan, though they usually weaken by the time they reach the Pakistani coastline.

Palau

Palau consists of a string of islands that is rugged and surrounds a lagoon. Elevations up to  exist within the island group.

Panama
Inflow to the south of Hurricane Mitch brought impressive rainfalls to the Panama. Veledero de Tole recorded  of rainfall between October 22 and 31, 1998.

Philippines

This Philippines island archipelago is fairly mountainous, with the highest terrain found in Luzon.

Samoa

Singapore
Typhoon Vamei of December 20, 2001 was the only known storm to ever hit the island state. It dropped  of rainfall.

Solomon Islands

South Africa
Tropical Cyclone Eline in February 2000 dropped significant rains on portions of South Africa.

Spain
The only tropical cyclone to reach mainland Europe was 2005's Hurricane Vince. It dropped  of rain on the plain near Cordoba.

Sri Lanka
A tropical depression in early October 2004 led to heavy rains across Sri Lanka. The maximum was measured at Galle where  fell in the 24‑hour period ending at 0600 UTC on the 2nd.

St. Brandon, South Indian Ocean

St. Kitts and Nevis

Taiwan
The mountainous island of Taiwan experiences an average of 1.8 tropical cyclone landfalls each year. Due to its rugged topography, Taiwan sees extreme rains from tropical cyclones, particularly in its central mountain range.

Thailand

Tropical cyclones occasionally cross the Malay Peninsula from the northwest Pacific into the Bay of Bengal.

Tonga

United Kingdom

Mainland

Anguilla

Bermuda
Bermuda has not historically received overwhelming rains out of tropical cyclones. This could be because of the rapid pace storms usually pass the island and the lack of mountains on the island.

Cayman Islands

United States

Vanuatu

Venezuela
A few tropical cyclones have skimmed the northern coast of South America over recent decades. Tropical Storm Bret (1993) dropped  of rain in ten hours at Guanare, Portuguesa, Venezuela.

Vietnam

See also
 China tropical cyclone rainfall climatology
 Extratropical cyclone
 List of wettest tropical cyclones
 List of wettest tropical cyclones in the United States
 Mexico tropical cyclone rainfall climatology
 Tropical cyclone
 Tropical cyclone rainfall climatology
 Tropical cyclone rainfall forecasting
 Tropical cyclogenesis
 United States tropical cyclone rainfall climatology

References

External links
 Tropical Cyclone Rainfall Data from the United States Weather Prediction Centre
 Camp Perrin, Haiti Rainfall Records
 Hurricane Impacts on Jamaica
 Major Hydrologic Events in Cuba since 1962
 Maximum 24-hour rainfall totals on Guam 1924–1992
 Pacific ENSO update – 1st quarter 2005
 Typhoon Rainfall Statistics and Forecasting (China)
 World Records for Tropical Cyclone Rainfall

Tropical cyclone meteorology
Wettest country
Wettest
Weather extremes of Earth